Orbiting Cathedrals is the only album by Pro>Tech, a side project of Canadian industrial musician Bill Leeb with the help of industrial musician Chris Peterson. The project was launched in 1997 in the wake of the release of the album [FLA]vour of the Weak from industrial band Front Line Assembly, which at the time consisted of Leeb and Peterson. Orbiting Cathedrals is supposed to be a musical twin of [FLA]vour of the Weak. The album was released through German label Dossier and re-released in 2000 by Hypnotic. Tracks from Orbiting Cathedrals have also appeared on Cryogenic Studios and Cryogenic Studio, Vol. 2, compilation albums with songs from Front Line Assembly and related projects.

Critical reception

Orbiting Cathedrals was met mostly with positive reviews. However, Culture Shock in their mixed review called the album "an amalgam of the various styles of techno in 1996/7" and considered the album mostly "pretty unobstrusive, and therefore nothing all that interesting."

Track listing

Personnel
 Bill Leeb – electronic instruments, mixing
 Chris Peterson – programming, additional sounds, mixing
 Carylann Loeppky – cover artwork

References

1997 albums
Bill Leeb albums